Paul T. Ernster (born January 26, 1982) is a former American football punter. He was drafted by the Denver Broncos in the seventh round of the 2005 NFL Draft. He played college football in Northern Arizona.

Ernster has also been a member of the Cleveland Browns, Detroit Lions and Pittsburgh Steelers.

Early years
Ernster was born in Phoenix, Arizona. He attended Ironwood High School in Glendale, Arizona where he was a two-year letterman in both football and baseball. In football, he was an All-State kicker, he won All-Region honors as a linebacker, kicker, and punter, and was a two-time special teams Most Valuable Player award winner, and was the Defensive MVP as a senior.

College career
Ernster attended Northern Arizona University, and was a kicker, until punting his senior year. As a senior punter, he led the NCAA Division I-AA level, and the nation in average yards per punt, averaging 47.8 yards per punt. During his career at Northern Arizona University, he was a three-time All-Big Sky Conference All-Academics selection, a consensus All-American punter pick as a senior, and he finished his college career with 213 points, which ranks third in school history. As a kicker, he made 39 out of 65 field goal attempts, and 96 out of 100 PATs attempted.

Professional career

Denver Broncos
Ernster was drafted by the Denver Broncos, serving as their punter for two years, and was documented in A Few Seconds of Panic. After replacing Todd Sauerbrun in 2006, Ernster led the NFL in kickoff distance and was third in touchbacks. However, out of 32 punters with at least 40 punts, Ernster finished 28th with a gross average of 41.7 yards.

Detroit Lions
On April 11, 2008, Ernster was signed by the Detroit Lions. He was waived on July 29.

Pittsburgh Steelers
Ernster was claimed off waivers by the Pittsburgh Steelers on July 29, 2008 after punter Daniel Sepulveda tore his ACL. However, he was cut prior to the regular season. He was re-signed by the Steelers on November 5 after the team released punter Mitch Berger. The Steelers released Ernster and re-signed Berger on November 24 after Ernster turned in three below average performances, averaging just 31.3 yards a punt.

Career statistics

References

External links
Denver Broncos bio
Detroit Lions bio
Pittsburgh Steelers bio

1982 births
Living people
American football placekickers
American football punters
Northern Arizona Lumberjacks football players
Denver Broncos players
Cleveland Browns players
Detroit Lions players
Pittsburgh Steelers players
Players of American football from Phoenix, Arizona